(Gaius) Vettius Gratus (fl. 3rd century) was a Roman senator who was appointed consul in AD 250.

Biography
A member of the Patrician gens Vetti, Vettius Gratus was related to the consuls Gaius Vettius Gratus Atticus Sabinianus (possibly his brother or cousin) and Gaius Vettius Gratus Sabinianus (possibly his grandson or grand-nephew). 

In AD 250, Vettius Gratus was appointed consul posterior, serving alongside the emperor Decius.

It is speculated that Vettius Gratus had a son, Gratus, who became consul in AD 280.

Sources
 Martindale, J. R.; Jones, A. H. M, The Prosopography of the Later Roman Empire, Vol. I AD 260–395, Cambridge University Press (1971)
 Mennen, Inge, Power and Status in the Roman Empire, AD 193-284 (2011)

References

3rd-century Romans
Imperial Roman consuls
Late Roman Empire political office-holders
Vettii
Year of birth unknown
Year of death unknown